Dan Weinstein may refer to:
Dan Weinstein (speed skater) (born 1981), Olympic short track speedskater
Dan Weinstein (musician), music composer, violinist, and trombonist